Q is a free emulator software that runs on Mac OS X, including OS X on PowerPC. Q is Mike Kronenberg's port of the open source and generic processor emulator QEMU.  Q uses Cocoa and other Apple technologies, such as Core Image and Core Audio, to achieve its emulation.  Q can be used to run Windows, or any other operating system based on the x86 architecture, on the Macintosh.

Q is available as a Universal Binary and, as such, can run on Intel or PowerPC based Macintosh systems. However, some target guest architectures are unsupported on Lion (due to the removal of Rosetta) such as SPARC, MIPS, ARM and x86_64 since the softmmus are PowerPC only binaries.

Unlike QEMU, which is a command-line application, Q has a native graphical interface for managing and configuring virtual machines.

As of June 2022, the project was "on hold".

See also
 qcow
 Comparison of platform virtualization software
 SPIM
 Emulator
 QEMU

References

External links
 Q [kju:] - the new homepage of the Q project
 MacUpdate listing
 The QEMU forum for Mac OS X
 Boot Camp, Q/QEMU, Parallels: Pros/cons InfoWorld (April 17, 2006)

MacOS emulation software
MacOS-only free software
Virtualization software